Ready to Rumble is a 2000 American comedy film.

Ready to Rumble may also refer to:

"Ready to Rumble" (Ben 10 episode)
"Let's get ready to rumble!", a catchphrase of Michael Buffer
Ready 2 Rumble Boxing, a video game
Ready 2 Rumble Boxing: Round 2
Ready 2 Rumble: Revolution